Susan Gail Alfond (born 1946) is an American investor, philanthropist, and billionaire.

Biography
Alfond was born to a Jewish family, the daughter of Dorothy (née Levine) and Harold Alfond.  Her father founded the Dexter Shoe Company in 1958 and sold it to Warren Buffett in 1993 for $433 million of Berkshire Hathaway stock. Forbes lists her as the richest person in Maine.

Personal life
Alfond has three children, Emily Pearl, Daniel Pearl, and David Pearl. She lives in Scarborough, Maine.

References

American billionaires
Jewish American philanthropists
American women philanthropists
1946 births
Living people
People from Scarborough, Maine
Businesspeople from Maine
Susan